Avenida La Plata is a station on Line E of the Buenos Aires Underground located at the intersection of Avenida Directorio and Avenida La Plata, at the limit between Caballito and Boedo. The station was used as a set in the 1996 Argentine science fiction film Moebius. It was opened on 24 April 1966 as the western terminus of a one station extension from Boedo. On 23 June 1973 the line was extended further west to José María Moreno.

References

External links

Buenos Aires Underground stations